Chlorpropham or CIPC is a plant growth regulator and herbicide used as a sprout suppressant for grass weeds, alfalfa, lima and snap beans, blueberries, cane fruit, carrots, cranberries, ladino clover, garlic, seed grass, onions, spinach, sugar beets, tomatoes, safflower, soybeans, gladioli and woody nursery stock. It is also used to inhibit potato sprouting and for sucker control in tobacco. Chlorpropham is available in emulsifiable concentrate and liquid formulations.

Chlorpropham is approved for use as a plant regulator and herbicide only on potatoes in the United States. The use of CIPC was banned in the EU and UK in 2019 after it was not reauthorised for use due to toxicity concerns, with sales prohibited from January 2020.

Uses 
When it is used as an anti-sprouting agent for potatoes, the formulation is based on HN formulation, Hot Fogging.

Commercial names include Bud Nip, Taterpex, Preventol, Elbanil, Metoxon, Nexoval, Stickman Pistols, Preweed, Furloe, Stopgerme-S, Sprout Nip, Mirvale, Bygran, ChlorIPC, Spud-Nic, Spud-Nie, Chloro-IFK, Chloro-IPC, Keim-stop, Triherbicide CIPC, OORJA.
For herbicide, an EC formulation is used so that it is dissolvable in water for spray in the field.

Toxicity
Chlorpropham displays a low level toxicity profile, with no signs of acute toxicity after exposure of less than 1000 mg/kg/day. Long term exposure at high doses (≥ 1000 mg/kg/day) could cause reduction of body weight gain, decrease in hematocrit and hemoglobin, and increase in blood reticulocytes.

Regarding the carcinogenic risk, chlorpropham is classified by the EPA as group E (non-carcinogenic). One of its metabolites is 3-chloroaniline.

The acceptable daily intake ranges from 0.03 mg/kg (FAO 2001) to 0.05 mg/Kg (EPA 1996 and EC 2003).

Stability
Chlorpropham is partially degraded in the environment under aerobic conditions (15% to 30% after 100 days) and partially hydrolysed in water solution (90% after 59 to 130 days).

A study of the stability of chlorpropham in potatoes (estimated concentration of chlorpropham: 1.8 to 7.6 mg/kg at 10 days post-application) revealed that mean concentration of chlorpropham in the tuber decreased spontaneously by 24% and 42% at 28 days and 65 days postapplication respectively. The study also showed that peeling removed 91–98% and washing 33–47%. Residues of chlorpropham were detected in the boiled potatoes, in the boiling water, in the French-fried potatoes and in the frying oil. According to this study, the theoretical dose for a 20 kg infant eating 100g of crude-peeled tuber would be 0.00018 to 0.00342 mg/kg.

References

External links 
 US NIST Chemistry WebBook Entry
 Toxicology Info Cornell University

Herbicides
Plant growth regulators
Carbamates